Andrew Donnal (born March 3, 1992) is a former American football offensive tackle. He played college football at Iowa. His brother, Mark, played collegiate basketball at Michigan & Clemson.

College career
Donnal played college football for the University of Iowa.

Professional career

St. Louis / Los Angeles Rams
Donnal was selected by the St. Louis Rams in the fourth round, 119th overall pick, in the 2015 NFL Draft.

On November 11, 2017, Donnal was waived by the Rams.

Baltimore Ravens
On November 13, 2017, Donnal was claimed off waivers by the Baltimore Ravens, reuniting him with Iowa teammate Carl Davis. He was waived on August 31, 2018.

Detroit Lions
On September 2, 2018, Donnal was claimed off waivers by the Detroit Lions.

On March 22, 2019, Donnal re-signed with the Lions. He was released on August 31, 2019.

Miami Dolphins
On September 24, 2019, Donnal was signed by the Miami Dolphins. He was waived on November 16, 2019.

Indianapolis Colts
On December 30, 2019, Donnal signed a reserve/future contract with the Indianapolis Colts. He was placed on injured reserve on August 23, 2020. He was released with an injury settlement on September 1, 2020.

References

External links
 Baltimore Ravens bio
Los Angeles Rams bio
Iowa Hawkeyes profile
Detroit Lions bio

1992 births
Living people
Players of American football from Ohio
People from Lucas County, Ohio
American football offensive tackles
Iowa Hawkeyes football players
St. Louis Rams players
Los Angeles Rams players
Baltimore Ravens players
Detroit Lions players
Miami Dolphins players
Indianapolis Colts players